Leisure (stylized as LEISURE) are a soul, R&B and pop band from Auckland, formed in Muriwai in 2015. The band consists of Djeisan Suskov, Jaden Parkes, Josh Fountain, Tom Young, and Jordan Arts, all established New Zealand musicians who have worked in the Auckland scene since the 2000s. 

Since their formation the band have produced three albums (Leisure in 2016, Twister in 2019, and Sunsetter in 2021 ), two EPs (Side A in 2020 and Side B in 2021) and various singles, such as "Spark It Up", "Money" and "Got It Bad" (which was featured in the American television drama You).

The band's members established themselves in the early 2000s, with the debut album by Jaden Parkes' band Goodnight Nurse, Always and Never, being certified gold after its 2006 release. Furthermore, Jordan Arts' Kids of 88 had various hits from their debut album Sugarpills, such as "My House", "Just a Little Bit" and "Downtown". Fountain, who is also known for being Benee's producer, recalled getting the band together after having casual music sessions during a spontaneous holiday at a bach on the West Coast of Auckland, subsequently forming a supergroup.

References

External links

Soul musical groups
New Zealand pop music groups
Musical groups established in 2015
2015 establishments in New Zealand